The 2011 Lamar Hunt U.S. Open Cup tournament proper features teams from four of the five tiers of the American Soccer Pyramid. These four levels—Major League Soccer, United Soccer League's Pro League, the USL's Premier Development League, the National Premier Soccer League, and the United States Adult Soccer Association— each have their own separate qualification process to trim their ranks down to their final club delegations in the months leading up to the start of the tournament proper.

The event will feature 40 teams. Eight clubs from Major League Soccer will participate, six that automatically qualify based on last season's league position and two that qualify through a play-in tournament. In addition, 11 USL Pro League clubs, 9 clubs from the USL Premier Development League, 4 clubs from the National Premier Soccer League, and 8 USASA clubs and will also qualify.

The provisional second tier of the soccer pyramid, a reincarnation of the North American Soccer League, was disallowed by the United States Soccer Federation for the American-based clubs to participate into the tournament, mainly due to scheduling conflicts it would cause.

Major League Soccer
The following MLS clubs have already qualified for the 2011 US Open Cup:

Los Angeles Galaxy – 1st overall in 2010
Real Salt Lake – 2nd overall in 2010
New York Red Bulls – 3rd overall in 2010

FC Dallas – 4th overall in 2010
Columbus Crew – 5th overall in 2010
Seattle Sounders FC – 6th overall in 2010

The following MLS clubs are attempting to qualify for the tournament:

Colorado Rapids – 7th overall in 2010
San Jose Earthquakes – 8th overall in 2010
Sporting Kansas City – 9th overall in 2010
Chicago Fire – 10th overall in 2010
Houston Dynamo – 12th overall in 2010

New England Revolution – 13th overall in 2010
Philadelphia Union – 14th overall in 2010
Chivas USA – 15th overall in 2010
D.C. United – 16th overall in 2010
Portland Timbers – Expansion club

Bracket
The bracket is loosely based on geography, rather than seeding. This is the first time qualification is bracketed geographically. In the previous years, teams were bracketed strictly according to seeding. Seeds 7–10 play an extra round. All teams in the top bracket are the westernmost teams, except for Chicago. All teams in the bottom bracket are easternmost teams, except for Houston.

Note: Scorelines use the standard U.S. convention of placing the home team on the right-hand side of the score boxes.

Play-in round

Qualification semifinals

Qualification finals

North American Soccer League

USSF President Sunil Gulati announced that NASL teams were being denied entry due to the lateness of their provisional sanctioning.

USL Professional League
All eleven U.S.-based clubs qualified for the tournament.

Charleston Battery
Charlotte Eagles
Dayton Dutch Lions
F.C. New York
Harrisburg City Islanders
Los Angeles Blues

Orlando City
Pittsburgh Riverhounds
Richmond Kickers
Rochester Rhinos
Wilmington Hammerheads

Premier Development League

The PDL received nine berths to the 2011 U.S. Open Cup.  One entrant from each division will be determined based upon the results of four PDL divisional games also serving as U.S. Open Cup qualifiers.  Canadian and Bermudan PDL sides are not eligible for U.S. Open Cup play.

As part of PDL qualification, the Northwest Division spot was completely deadlocked between Portland Timbers U23's and Kitsap Pumas. Instead of going to a lottery, the two sides mutually agreed to hold an unprecedented "fifth game" tiebreaker, using their regular season game on June 3, 2011, to determine the slot.

Qualified clubs

For standings see 2011 PDL season.

National Premier Soccer League

In contrast to prior years, where NPSL teams had to qualify for the U.S. Open Cup through the USASA Regional tournaments, the NPSL was awarded four entries to the 2011 U.S. Open Cup. The NPSL elected to give one berth to each of its four divisions.

Northeast Division
The Northeast Division representative was determined by a three-team tournament played on May 7 and May 27, 2011.

Brooklyn Italians qualify.

Southeast Division
The Southeast Division's qualifier was determined in a six-team tournament held at Finley Stadium in Chattanooga, Tennessee, on May 27–29, 2011.

Midwest Division
The Midwest Division slot was automatically awarded to the Madison 56ers.  The 56ers earned the bid as 2010 U.S. Open Cup division qualifying champions, as well as the fact none of the other divisional rivals had expressed interest in a qualifying tournament.

West Division
The West Division representative was awarded to the club with the highest point total after its first seven league matches. The berth was clinched by the Hollywood United Hitmen after the San Diego Flash had two games forfeited by the NPSL for the use of an illegal player.

Updated to games played May 19, 2011.
Tiebreakers: (1) Points; (2) Goal difference; (3) Goals scored
*-Includes 3–0 forfeitures imposed on San Diego Flash for using an illegal player

USASA 

For qualification into the U.S. Open Cup, the United States Adult Soccer Association organizes a series of state and regional tournaments to determine its regional participants. Each individual region's National Cup doubles as the qualification process for the U.S. Open Cup.

Qualified Clubs

Region I 

The USASA Region I Cup determines two qualifiers for the U.S. Open Cup. The first round of qualifying begins on May 1, 2011. The national finals prior to the third round proper are scheduled between July 15–17, 2011.

Each of the states in Region I conduct their own state qualification propers from February to March 2011 to send representatives to the regional tournament. Delaware, Maine, New Hampshire, Vermont, and West Virginia did not enter a club into the 2011 Region I Tournament.

Region II 

Each of the states in Region II conduct their own state qualification propers from to send representatives to the regional tournament. Kentucky, Minnesota, Missouri, Nebraska, North Dakota, Ohio, South Dakota, and Wisconsin did not enter a club into the 2011 Region II Tournament.

Region III 

Teams that qualify in Region III were invited to play in the Region III National Cup in Tuscaloosa, Alabama on Memorial Day Weekend. The draw for the tournament took place on May 26, 2011, the night before play bega. Alabama, Arkansas, Georgia, Mississippi, and Tennessee did not enter teams into the Region III Tournament.

Regals FC win tiebreaker penalty shootout with CASL Elite to advance.

Region IV

References

External links
 U.S. Soccer Federation
 TheCup.us – Unofficial U.S. Open Cup News 

 
Qual